Rhynchonelloidella smithi is a species of extinct, small-sized brachiopods, a marine rhynchonellate lampshell in the family Rhynchonellidae. It is roughly 9/16 inch (1.4 cm), and has about 21 ribs fanning out from the hinge.

Distribution
Rhynchonelloidella alemanica is known from the later Middle Jurassic (Bathonian) of England and Germany. The specimen that the description is based upon was collected in Fuller's Earth Rock, near Bath, Somerset, England (lectotype). Further specimens were collected from Weymouth, Bruton, Wiltshire, Gloucester, and Lamyat Beacon, Dyrham, Avon, Bristol Channel, Whatley, Somerset, and Sengenthal, Germany.

Habitat
During the Middle c, the fossil locations cited were on continental shelves, probably in tropical, shallow coral seas, where this lampshell lived as a stationary epifaunal suspension feeder.

Gallery

References

Rhynchonellida
Prehistoric brachiopods
Jurassic brachiopods
Animals described in 1878
Jurassic animals of Europe